Wouter Goes (born 10 June 2004) is a Dutch professional footballer who plays for Eredivisie club AZ Alkmaar.

Club career 
Having come through the AZ Alkmaar academy, where he soon developed as a leader of the youth teams, Wouter Goes signed his first professional contract with the club in November 2020, as he already was the captain of AZ under-17.

During the 2021–22 season, Goes was a central element of the under-19 team that played the Youth League, qualifying to the final 16 through the Champions Path, after eliminating the likes of Angers and Villareal.

He made his professional debut for Jong AZ on the 4 February 2022, starting in the 2–1 away Eerste Divisie loss to Ajax reserve team.

Goes made his Eredivisie debut for the senior squad of AZ Alkmaar on 4 February 2023 against Volendam, as a starter. On 25 February, he scored his first Eredivisie goal in a 2–1 victory over Cambuur.

International career 
A Netherlands youth international, Goes is a regular with the several Dutch youth selections since January 2019.

References

External links

2004 births
Sportspeople from Amsterdam
21st-century Dutch people
Living people
Dutch footballers
Netherlands youth international footballers
Association football defenders
Jong AZ players
AZ Alkmaar players
Eerste Divisie players
Eredivisie players